Gilles Caouette  (February 16, 1940 – August 13, 2009) was a Canadian politician and member of Parliament.

Caouette was born in Rouyn-Noranda, Quebec. His father, Réal Caouette, was a prominent Social Credit politician, and leader of the Ralliement créditiste and later the Social Credit Party of Canada.

Gilles followed in his father’s footsteps, and ran unsuccessfully for election to the House of Commons of Canada as a Ralliement créditiste or Social Credit candidate three times (1963, 1964 and 1965). He finally won election from Charlevoix in the 1972 election with a margin of 159 votes.

Gilles was defeated in the 1974 election, and in a 1975 by-election in Hochelaga.

His father died in 1976, resulting in a by-election in the Témiscamingue riding that his father had held since 1962.  Gilles won the May 24, 1977 by-election, and returned to the House of Commons. On June 24, 1977, Réal’s successor as Social Credit party leader, André-Gilles Fortin, died at the age of 33.  Gilles became acting party leader on June 29. He had intended to run at the party's leadership convention but refused to run and resigned as interim leader when the party's executive council decided to hold the convention earlier rather than later and hold it in Winnipeg, Manitoba instead of Quebec where most party members (and all of its Members of Parliament) lived. He was replaced as interim leader by Charles-Arthur Gauthier.

Caouette ran in the 1979 election but lost his seat in the House of Commons.

Outside politics he worked as an administrator, draftsman, research director, and as a technician.

Electoral record

References
Source: History of the Federal Electoral Ridings since 1867

1940 births
2009 deaths
Members of the House of Commons of Canada from Quebec
Social Credit Party of Canada MPs
Social Credit Party of Canada leaders
People from Rouyn-Noranda